Bryan Callen (born January 26, 1967) is an American stand-up comedian, actor, writer and podcaster. He studied acting at the Beverly Hills Playhouse. Callen initiated his career as one of the original cast members on the sketch comedy series MADtv. Callen played Coach Mellor in The Goldbergs and reprised the role as a main character in the Goldbergs spinoff series Schooled. He is co-host of the podcast The Fighter and the Kid, alongside Brendan Schaub.

Early life
Callen was born on a military base in Manila, Philippines. He is the son of American parents, Victoria Callen (née Sclafani) and Michael A. Callen. Because of his father's career as an international banker, Callen lived overseas until he was fourteen years old, including in the Philippines, India, Pakistan, Lebanon, Greece and Saudi Arabia. He graduated from Northfield Mount Hermon High School in Gill, Massachusetts in 1985. He then attended American University in Washington, D.C., where he graduated with a bachelor's degree in History. He is of Italian and Irish descent.

Career

MADtv (1995–1997) and other television projects
Callen was one of the eight original cast members when MADtv debuted in 1995. Callen's characters included Pool Boy from Cabana Chat with Dixie Wetsworth, motivational speaker Al Casdy, and "relationship-challenged" death row inmate Jeremy Anderson. Callen also performed impressions of Bill Clinton, Robert De Niro, Al Gore, Luke Perry, Steven Seagal, Sammy Hagar, Kevin Bacon, Jim Carrey, Ted Knight and Arnold Schwarzenegger, among others.

Callen has guest starred on television series such as Entourage, NewsRadio, Oz, Frasier, Suddenly Susan, NYPD Blue, Law & Order: Special Victims Unit, CSI, 7th Heaven, Rude Awakening, Less Than Perfect, The King of Queens, Sex and the City, Kingdom, Stacked, Las Vegas, Reba, Fat Actress, Californication  and How I Met Your Mother.

Callen played Ricky's sexually abusive father on The Secret Life of the American Teenager on ABC Family. He also makes frequent appearances on Chelsea Lately. He hosted the E! show Bank of Hollywood, and currently appears as a commentator of The Smoking Gun Presents: World's Dumbest... on truTV.

Callen also plays the role of Coach Mellor in The Goldbergs and its spinoff series Schooled. The pilot aired on January 24, 2018. The spinoff was picked up for 13 episode order for the fall 2018 television season.

Callen co-wrote and co-starred in Dream Crushers with Will Sasso, Sara Rue, and Scott Thompson. The series was shot in 2009 but unaired until 2011. He appeared with Melinda Hill in an episode of the 2012–13 web series Romantic Encounters.

Ten Minute Podcast
Beginning on February 20, 2012, Callen and fellow actors and comedians Will Sasso and Chris D'Elia began the Ten Minute Podcast. Tommy Blacha and Chad Kultgen later replaced Callen and D'Elia.

The Fighter and the Kid
Callen currently cohosts a podcast titled The Fighter and the Kid with Brendan Schaub, and producers Chin and Kat. The podcast formerly focused on the realm of mixed martial arts, but since their departure from Fox Sports, they regularly discuss pop culture and current events as well.

Schaub and Callen performed the podcast live on a national tour in 2016. The tour included such venues as The Vic Theatre (Chicago), Gramercy Theatre (New York City), and Wilbur Theatre (Boston); culminating at the Comedy Store in Los Angeles.

In 2016 Schaub and Callen released The Fighter and the Kid 3D. The twelve episode digital download series features sketch comedy pieces based on the duo's podcast personas.

Schaub and Callen regularly appear alongside Joe Rogan during live event broadcasts, such as the UFC and Glory kickboxing, for what is called the Fight Companion. They also appeared on the MTV show Ridiculousness, hosted by Rob Dyrdek, in June 2016.

Other
Callen has a chapter giving advice in Tim Ferriss' book Tools of Titans.

Stand-up comedy 
Callen headlines his solo stand up comedy act at venues across the United States. In early 2016 he released Never Grow Up which was recorded live at the Irvine Improv in April, 2015. Never Grow Up was released online in conjunction with The Fighter and the Kid 3D Web series. he released a special in 2019 called Complicated Apes.

Sexual misconduct allegations 
On July 31, 2020, following the accusations of misconduct towards Chris D'Elia from a month prior, it was reported by the Los Angeles Times that four women, including actress Kathryn Fiore, told the newspaper that Callen mistreated them and described incidents of sexual misconduct including rape, assault, and disturbing comments that date back to 1999. 
In a tweet, Callen denied the accusations.

Callen filled an anti-SLAPP motion against Fiore and her husband Gabriel Tigerman. In January 2021 Judge Monica Bachner ruled in the couple's favor, stating that Callen "did not meet his burden of demonstrating a probability of prevailing on his claim."

Filmography

Comedy specials

Film

Television

References

External links

Official MADtv site

1967 births
Living people
Male actors from New York City
American male comedians
American male film actors
American male television actors
American male voice actors
American podcasters
American University alumni
People from the Bronx
Northfield Mount Hermon School alumni
People from Venice, Los Angeles
American sketch comedians
American stand-up comedians
Comedians from New York City
American expatriates in the Philippines
Comedians from California
21st-century American comedians